Nowshiravan may refer to:
 Nowshiravan, East Azerbaijan
 Nowshiravan, Kermanshah